Florentin Nicolae (born 23 February 1981) is a Romanian alpine skier. He competed in two events at the 2006 Winter Olympics.

References

1981 births
Living people
Romanian male alpine skiers
Olympic alpine skiers of Romania
Alpine skiers at the 2006 Winter Olympics
People from Ștefănești, Argeș